Donald Richard Norland (June 14, 1924 – December 30, 2007) was an American diplomat. He was the United States Ambassador to Botswana, Swaziland, Lesotho, and Chad.

Biography
Donald Roland was born in Laurens, Iowa, and grew up on a family farm. His father was an educator and state legislator. He attended the University of Northern Iowa and joined the United States Navy during World War II. He served on patrol torpedo boats and minesweepers in the Pacific Ocean. After the war, he graduated from the University of Minnesota, with a master's degree in political science in 1950. He joined the U.S. Foreign Service in 1952 and began his career as a cultural affairs officer at the U.S. Embassy in Rabat, Morocco. He was chargé d'affaires to the newly independent nations of Niger, Dahomey (now Benin) and Upper Volta (now Burkina Faso) while consul general in Ivory Coast (also known as Côte d'Ivoire) in 1960. He served in the early 1960s as a political officer at the NATO headquarters, then in Paris, France. He was a political counselor in the Hague, Netherlands, from 1964 to 1969. He was later deputy chief of mission and chargé d'affaires in Conakry, Guinea.

From 1976 to 1979, Norland served simultaneously as the United States Ambassador to Botswana, Lesotho and Swaziland, while resident at Gaborone. On November 17, 1979, Norland became the United States Ambassador to Chad. During the Libyan backed Chadian Civil War (1979-1982), N'Djamena was captured by the Transitional Government of National Unity, and diplomacy stopped. Norland and other diplomats were evacuated by French military forces to Cameroon in the summer of 1980, and Norland's ambassadorship had essentially ended. Norland retired from the foreign service in 1981, but he continued to lend his expertise on energy and telecommunications projects in Sudan, Nigeria and Chad. He worked with the Harvard Institute for International Development and the U.S. Chamber of Commerce to help economic development. From  1987 to 1989, he headed the training program on African studies at the State Department's Foreign Service Institute.

References

External links
 United States Department of State: Chiefs of Mission for Chad
 United States Department of State: Chad
 United States Embassy in N'Djamena
 Donald R. Norland at SourceWatch

Ambassadors of the United States to Chad
Ambassadors of the United States to Botswana
Ambassadors of the United States to Eswatini
Ambassadors of the United States to Lesotho
University of Minnesota College of Liberal Arts alumni
1924 births
2007 deaths
People from Laurens, Iowa
United States Foreign Service personnel
United States Army personnel of World War II
American expatriates in Morocco
American expatriates in Niger
American expatriates in Benin
American expatriates in Burkina Faso
American expatriates in Ivory Coast
American expatriates in France
American expatriates in the Netherlands
American expatriates in Guinea